The deepwater sicklefin houndshark (Hemitriakis abdita) or the darksnout houndshark, is a houndshark of the family Triakidae. It is found in the western central Pacific, in the Coral Sea off Queensland and in the waters off New Caledonia.

References

External links
 Fishes of Australia : Hemitriakis abdita

deepwater sicklefin houndshark
Fauna of Queensland
Fish of New Caledonia
deepwater sicklefin houndshark